Bahon, sometimes called Bohon, is a commune in Grande-Rivière-du-Nord Arrondissement in the Nord, department of Haiti. It is located on the Grand Rivière du Nord (river). It was formerly (1915) located on the railroad south from Cap-Haïtien.

Notes

External links 

Populated places in Nord (Haitian department)
Communes of Haiti